Westford Institute of Film Technology (WIFT) is a film and animation institute based in Cochin, offering courses in Direction, Cinematography, Editing, Scripting, Sound Design, Photography, Animation and Visual Effects. It was formed in 2011.

See also
 Film and Television Institute of India
 State Institute of Film and Television
 Satyajit Ray Film and Television Institute

References

External links

Film schools in India
Animation schools in India
Education in Kochi
Educational institutions established in 2011
2011 establishments in Kerala